Happy Valley is one of the 13 constituencies in the Wan Chai District of Hong Kong which was created in 1982.

The constituency loosely covers Happy Valley in Hong Kong Island with the estimated population of 13,150.

Councillors represented

1982 to 1985

1985 to 1994

1994 to present

Election results

2010s

2000s

1990s

1980s

Notes

References

Constituencies of Hong Kong
1982 in Hong Kong
Constituencies of Wan Chai District Council
1982 establishments in Hong Kong
Constituencies established in 1982